The Pied Piper is the title character of the traditional German folk tale the Pied Piper of Hamelin.

Pied Piper may also refer to:

Music 
The Pied Pipers, a singing group in the 1940s through the 1950s
"The Pied Piper" (song), a song written and originally recorded by Steve Duboff and Artie Kornfield and by Crispian St. Peters in 1966
"Pied Piper", a song by Jethro Tull, from their 1976 album Too Old to Rock 'n' Roll: Too Young to Die!
"Pied Piper", a song by Petra, from their 1983 album Not of this World
"Pied Piper" (BTS song), 2017
Pied Piper, a 1984 album by Chico Freeman
The Pied Piper, a 1995 compilation album of Bunny Berigan recordings dating from 1935 to 1940
Pied Piper, a 1995 compilation album of Crispian St. Peters recordings dating from the 1960s
Pied Piper (Donovan album), 2002
Pied Piper (The Pillows album), 2008
DJ Pied Piper and the Masters of Ceremonies, a UK garage collaboration

Film and television
The Pied Piper (1933 film), an animated film in the Silly Symphonies series
The Pied Piper (1942 film), starring Monty Woolley, based on the 1942 novel by Nevil Shute
The Pied Piper (1972 film), a Jacques Demy film, starring Donovan
The Pied Piper (1986 film), a Czechoslovak animated film
"The Pied Piper," a 1990 episode of War of the Worlds
The Pied Piper, a radio and later television children's program presented in Australia by Keith Smith
The Pied Piper (Shrek), a character in Shrek Forever After
Pied Piper (TV series), a 2016 South Korean drama
"Pied Piper", a fictional application and cloud storage company featured in the HBO series Silicon Valley

Literature 
Pied Piper (novel), a 1942 novel by Nevil Shute
The Pied Piper, a 1999 novel by Ridley Pearson
Pied Piper (comics), a DC comic book character
Pied Piper Comics, a short-lived US comic book publisher in the late 1980s

Other uses 
Xenosaga: Pied Piper, a video game
Eurytela hiarbas, a brush-footed butterfly commonly known as the pied piper
Operation Pied Piper, the codename for the evacuation of British children during World War II
Operation Pied Piper, the codename for an evacuation of refugees from Romania to Palestine during World War II arranged by Joice and Sydney Loch
Dean Corll (1939–1973), serial killer known as Pied Piper
R. Kelly (born 1967), singer sometimes known as, "The Pied Piper of R&B"

See also 

Charles Schmid (1942–1975), serial killer known as "The Pied Piper of Tucson"
Pied Piper of Hamelin (disambiguation)
Piper (disambiguation)
Pied (disambiguation)